Jocelyn Jee Esien (born 2 March 1979) is a British comedian, actress and writer of Nigerian origin. She stars in the hidden-camera show 3 Non-Blondes, and her own comedy sketch show, Little Miss Jocelyn.

Life and career
Esien was born in Hackney, London, to Nigerian parents. She attended Raine's Foundation School, and initially studied law before giving up to study drama, graduating from Guildhall School of Music and Drama. She came to prominence in 2003 in the BBC hidden-camera show 3 Non-Blondes, having also appeared in other television series such as The Fast Show and The Bill. In 2006 she wrote and starred in her own comedy sketch show called Little Miss Jocelyn, a second series of which aired in January 2008. This show marks the first time in the history of television – in either the US or the UK – that a black woman has been given her own solo comedy sketch show.

In 2000, Esien won the Best Newcomer award at the Black International Comedy Awards, and she won a New Talent Award in the Women in Film and Television Awards 2006.

In 2007, Esien featured in Girls Aloud and Sugababes' Comic Relief video for "Walk This Way", where she puts a parking ticket on Ewen Macintosh, a reference to the character Jiffy from the show Little Miss Jocelyn.

Esien appeared in the second series of The Sarah Jane Adventures as Clyde Langer's mother, Carla. In 2010, Esien reprised the role in two further episodes of the show, titled The Empty Planet and aired on 1 and 2 November 2010, as well as in the fifth series story, The Curse of Clyde Langer, which aired on 10 and 11 October 2011.

On 11 June 2009, it was stated that Little Miss Jocelyn would not be brought back for a third series. In November 2009, Esien played the part of waitress Cindie Smith in the ITV series Collision.
From 2009 to 2012 she starred in three series of Beauty of Britain, a comedy drama on BBC Radio 4.
On 22 September 2010, Esien returned to BBC Three for One Non-Blonde: Down Under, an eight-part comedy stunt show with new character creations. She plays characters such as a hermaphrodite rapper and a socialite, touring New Zealand. She also appeared alongside famous British comedians in BBC One's Ronnie Corbett Christmas special, The One Ronnie.

In 2011, Esien appeared as Tasha in British comedy Anuvahood. and also in British comedy show Some Girls.

In January and February 2013, she appeared in One Monkey Don't Stop No Show by the American playwright Don Evans, at the Tricycle Theatre, a London premiere for the play, and thereafter toured with the play nationally.

In 2013, she appeared in Gangsta Granny as Kelly.

Esien's other TV appearances include Autumn Leaves, a BBC comedy-drama; Some Girls, Uncle Max, After You've Gone, Holby City, The Lenny Henry Show, Ed Stone Is Dead, Comedy Nation, The Fast Show, Douglas, The Bill and In The Name of Love (TV movie). She has also made numerous stage appearances.

She appeared in the 2010 film StreetDance 3D and wrote an episode of the American reality TV show Jon & Kate Plus 8.

She also appeared in the BBC comedy Big School as Headmistress Ms Baron's (Frances de la Tour) personal assistant and secretary named Daphne, from 2013 to 2014.

Esien appeared in a cameo role as a PCSO in the long running BBC sitcom "Not Going Out" on 15 April 2022.

Filmography

Film

TV

References

External links

1979 births
Black British women comedians
Living people
English people of Nigerian descent
Black British actresses
People educated at Raine's Foundation School
People from Hackney Central
20th-century British actresses
21st-century British actresses